The 4th Alpine Division "Cuneense" was a division of the Royal Italian Army during World War II, which specialized in mountain warfare. The headquarters of the division was in the city of Cuneo, and the majority of its Alpini soldiers were drafted from the surrounding Province of Cuneo - hence the division's name "Cuneense". The division participated in all Italian World War II campaigns with the exception of the North African Campaign. The division was annihilated during Operation Little Saturn by Soviet forces in January 1943.

History 
The division's lineage begins on 19 October 1933 when the 1st Alpini Regiment in Mondovì and 2nd Alpini Regiment in Cuneo left the 1st Alpine Division "Taurinense" and entered the newly raised IV Alpine Brigade in Cuneo. On 27 October 1934 the brigade changed its name to IV Superior Alpine Command, which received the name Cuneense in December of the same year. The command received the newly formed 4th Mountain Artillery Regiment in Cuneo on 1 January 1934. 

On 31 October 1935 the IV Superior Alpine Command "Cuneense" was reformed as 4th Alpine Division "Cuneense" with the 1st and 2nd Alpini regiments and the 4th Alpine Artillery Regiment. On 25 December 1935 the Cuneense temporarily transferred its Alpini battalions "Pieve di Teco" and "Saluzzo" and one of its artillery batteries to the 5th Alpine Division "Pusteria" for the Second Italo-Ethiopian War.

World War II

Invasion of France 
The division participated in the Italian invasion of France in June 1940. On 22 June it entered French territory in the Chabriere and Mary valleys.

Greco-Italian War 
In December 1940 the division was sent as reinforcements to Albania for the Greco-Italian War. Between 15-17 December 1940 the division's units entered the front in the upper Devoll valley and inserted in 23 November the division had entered the front in the upper Devoll valley. On 18 March 1941 the division was taken out of the front and sent to Berat. At the end of March the division deployed to the Yugoslav-Albanian border for the upcoming Invasion of Yugoslavia. On 10 April the division crossed the border and advanced to Debar in Macedonia. After the war's conclusion the division returned to Italy in May 1941.

Soviet Union 
The Tridentina was one of the ten Italian divisions of the Italian Army in Russia, which fought on the Eastern Front. In July 1942 the division, together with the 2nd Alpine Division "Tridentina" and the 3rd Alpine Division "Julia" formed the Alpine Army Corps, which was transferred to Eastern Ukraine. In July 1942 the division arrived in Izium from where it marched eastwards to Millerovo and then onward to the Don river. The Italian units covered part of the left flank of the German 6th Army, which spearheaded the German summer offensive of 1942 into the city of Stalingrad.

On 12 December 1942 the Red Army's Operation Little Saturn commenced, which in its first stage attacked and encircled the Italian Army in Russia's II Army Corps and XXXV Army Corps. On 13 January 1943, the Red Army launched the second stage of Operation Little Saturn: four armies of General Filipp Golikov's Voronezh Front attacked, encircled, and destroyed the Hungarian Second Army near Svoboda on the Don to the northwest of the Alpine Army Corps and pushed back the remaining units of the German XXIV Army Corps on the Alpine Army Corps' left flank, thus encircling the Alpine Army Corps.

On the evening of 17 January, the Alpine Army Corps commander, General Gabriele Nasci, ordered a full retreat. At this point only the Tridentina division was still capable of conducting effective combat operations. The 40,000-strong mass of stragglers — Alpini and Italians from other commands, plus German and Hungarian Hussars — formed two columns that followed the Tridentina division which, supported by a handful of German armored vehicles, led the way westwards to the Axis lines. As the Soviets had already occupied every village bitter battles had to be fought to clear the way. On the morning of 28 January the division had walked 200 km, fought 20 battles, lost 80% of its men and spent 11 nights camped out in the middle of the Russian Steppe. Temperatures during the nights were between -30 °C and -40 °C. On 28 January the last remnants of the division were annihilated by Cossack forces. The last survivors of the 1st Alpini regiment burned the regiment's flag to prevent it from falling into enemy hands. The Cuneense then ceased to exist.

Casualties 
On 11 February 1943 the count of the survivors gave the following result:

 1st Alpini Regiment out of 5,282 men: 722 survivors; none of the soldiers of the battalions Ceva, Pieve di Teco and Mondovì survived.
 2nd Alpini Regiment out of 5,229 men: 208 survivors; none of the soldiers of the battalions Borgo San Dalmazzo and Saluzzo survived.
 4th Alpine Artillery Regiment out of 3,616 men: 379 survivors; none of the soldiers of the Artillery Group "Mondovì" survived.
 4th Mixed Engineer Battalion out of 1,240 men: 139 survivors
 Support units out of 1,313 men: 159 survivors

In total 1,607 men of the division's total of 17,460 survived Operation Little Saturn.

Return to Italy 
The remnants of the division were repatriated in March 1943 and the division was reformed on 1 May 1943 in Bolzano with troops of the 1st Alpini "Valley" Group of the 6th Alpine Division "Alpi Graie" and with the 104th Marching Alpini Regiment of the 8th Marching Division. After the announcement of the Armistice of Cassibile on 8 September 1943 the invading German forces disbanded the division.

Organization 
In late 1942 the division consisted of the following units:

  1st Alpini Regiment, in Mondovì
  Command and Command Company, in Mondovì
  Alpini Battalion "Ceva", in Ceva
  Command Company, in Ceva
  1st Company, in Ceva
  4th Company, in Bagnasco
  5th Company, in Ceva
  101st Support Weapons Company, in Ceva (Breda M37 machine guns, 45mm Mod. 35 and 81mm Mod. 35 mortars)
  Alpini Battalion "Pieve di Teco", in Chiusa Pesio
  Command Company, in Chiusa Pesio
  2nd Company, in Chiusa Pesio
  3rd Company, in Chiusa Pesio
  8th Company, in Roccaforte Mondovì
  102nd Support Weapons Company, in Chiusa Pesio (Breda M37 machine guns, 45mm Mod. 35 and 81mm Mod. 35 mortars)
  Alpini Battalion "Mondovì", in Mondovì
  Command Company, in Mondovì
  9th Company, in Torre Mondovì
  10th Company, in San Michele Mondovì
  11th Company, in Vicoforte
  103rd Support Weapons Company, in Vicoforte (Breda M37 machine guns, 45mm Mod. 35 and 81mm Mod. 35 mortars)
  84th Anti-tank Company, in Mondovì (47/32 anti-tank guns)
  1st Supply Squad, in Beinette
  21st Train Section, in San Bernolfo Mondovì (Logistic Support)
 1st Medical Section, in Mondovì
 612th Field Hospital, in Mondovì
 2nd Alpini Regiment, in Cuneo
  Command and Command Company, in Cuneo
  Alpini Battalion "Borgo San Dalmazzo", in Cuneo
  Command Company, in Cuneo
  13th Company, in Cuneo
  14th Company, in Cuneo
  15th Company, in Cuneo
  104th Support Weapons Company, in Cuneo (Breda M37 machine guns, 45mm Mod. 35 and 81mm Mod. 35 mortars)
  Alpini Battalion "Dronero", in Dronero
  Command Company, in Dronero
  17th Company, in Dronero
  18th Company, in San Damiano Macra
  19th Company, in Dronero
  105th Support Weapons Company, in Dronero (Breda M37 machine guns, 45mm Mod. 35 and 81mm Mod. 35 mortars)
  Alpini Battalion "Saluzzo", in Vinadio
  Command Company, in Vinadio
  21st Company, in Vinadio
  22nd Company, in Demonte
  23nd Company, in Demonte
  106th Support Weapons Company, in Demonte (Breda M37 machine guns, 45mm Mod. 35 and 81mm Mod. 35 mortars)
  14th Anti-tank Company, in Cuneo (47/32 anti-tank guns)
  2nd Supply Squad, in Dronero
  22nd Train Section, in Bene Vagienna (Logistic Support)
 2nd Medical Section, in Cuneo
 615th Field Hospital, in Dronero
 4th Alpine Artillery Regiment, in Cuneo
  Command and Command Unit, in Cuneo
  Mountain Artillery Group "Pinerolo", in Beinette (75/13 mountain guns)
  7th Battery, in Beinette
  8th Battery, in Borgo San Dalmazzo
  9th Battery, in Boves
  Ammunition and Supply Unit, in Crava
  Mountain Artillery Group "Mondovì", in Mondovì (75/13 mountain guns)
  10th Battery, in Villanova Mondovì
  11th Battery, in Mondovì
  12th Battery, in Villanova Mondovì
  Ammunition and Supply Unit, in Magliano Alpi
  Mountain Artillery Group "Val Po", in Piasco (reserve unit raised in 1942 for deployment to the Soviet Union; 105/11 mountain guns)
  72nd Battery, in Piasco
  73rd Battery, in Verzuolo
  Ammunition and Supply Unit, in Manta
  64th Anti-aircraft Battery, in Fontanelle Boves (20/65 Mod. 35 anti-aircraft guns)
  116th Anti-aircraft Battery, in Fontanelle Boves (20/65 Mod. 35 anti-aircraft guns)
  78th Anti-tank Battery (75/39 anti-tank guns; unit attached to the division for the campaign in the Soviet Union)
  IV Mixed Alpine Engineer Battalion, in Peveragno
  Command Platoon, in Peveragno
  104th Searchlight Section, Peveragno
  114th Telegraph and Radio Operators Company, in Peveragno
  124th Engineer Company, in Peveragno
  2nd Train Unit, in Busca
  4th Alpine Division Command Transport Squad, in Cuneo
  63rd Bakers Section, in Borgo San Dalmazzo
  107th Supply Section, in Chiusa Pesio
 201st Transport Section
 121st Mixed Transport Platoon
 701st Heavy Transport Platoon
 702nd Heavy Transport Platoon
 947th Heavy Transport Platoon
 306th Medical Section, in Cuneo
 613th Field Hospital, in Cuneo
 614th Field Hospital, in Cuneo
 616th Field Hospital, in Cuneo
 617th Field Hospital, in Cuneo
 413th Carabinieri Section, in Cuneo
 414th Carabinieri Section, in Cuneo
 203rd Field Post Office, in Cuneo

The division strength was 573 officers and 16,887 NCOs and soldiers for a total strength of 17,460 men. The division also had 176 horses, 4,698 mules and 584 transport vehicles at its disposal.

Military honors 
For their conduct during the Italian campaign in the Soviet Union the President of Italy awarded on 31 December 1947 to the three regiments of the 4th Alpine Division "Cuneense" Italy's highest military honor, the Gold Medal of Military Valour.

  1st Alpini Regiment on 5 March 1949
  2nd Alpini Regiment on 5 March 1949
  4th Alpine Artillery Regiment on 5 March 1949

Commanding officers 
The division's commanding officers were:

 Generale di Divisione Umberto Testa (1935 - 1937)
 Generale di Brigata Alberto Ferrero (1937 - 9 September 1938)
 Generale di Brigata Giovanni Maccario (10 September 1938 - 9 September 1939)
 Generale di Brigata Achille d'Havet (10 September 1939 - 10 June 1940)
 Generale di Divisione Alberto Ferrero (11 June 1940 - 15 February 1941)
 Colonel Armando Pezzana (acting, 16 February 1941 - 10 March 1941)
 Generale di Divisione Emilio Battisti (11 March 1941 - 27 January 1943) POW
 Generale di Divisione Carlo Fassi (15 May 1943 - 9 September 1943)

References

Sources 
 Homepage of the 4th Alpine Division Cuneense

Divisions of Italy in World War II
Alpini divisions of Italy
Military units and formations of Italy in Yugoslavia in World War II
Italian military units and formations of the Greco-Italian War
Military units and formations established in 1935
Military units and formations disestablished in 1943